Banaruiyeh District is a district (bakhsh) in Larestan County, Fars Province, Iran. At the 2006 census, its population was 17,174, in 3,710 families.  The District has one city: Banaruiyeh. The District has two rural districts (dehestan): Banaruiyeh Rural District and Deh Fish Rural District.

References 

Larestan County
Districts of Fars Province